Arawak, also known as Lokono (Lokono Dian, literally "people's talk" by its speakers), is an Arawakan language spoken by the Lokono (Arawak) people of South America in eastern Venezuela, Guyana, Suriname, and French Guiana. It is the eponymous language of the Arawakan language family.

Lokono is an active–stative language.

History 

Lokono is a critically endangered language. The Lokono language is most commonly spoken in South America. Some specific countries where this language is spoken include Guyana, Suriname, French Guiana, and Venezuela. The percentage of living fluent speakers with active knowledge of the language is estimated to be 5% of the ethnic population. There are small communities of semi-speakers who have varying degrees of comprehension and fluency in Lokono that keep the language alive. It is estimated that there are around 2,500 remaining speakers (including fluent and semi-fluent speakers). The decline in the use of Lokono as a language of communication is due to its lack of transmission from older speakers to the next generation. The language is not being passed to young children, as they are taught to speak the official languages of their countries.

Classification 
The Lokono language is part of the larger Arawakan language family spoken by indigenous people in South and Central America along with the Caribbean. The family spans four countries of Central America — Belize, Honduras, Guatemala, Nicaragua — and eight of South America — Bolivia, Guyana, French Guiana, Surinam, Venezuela, Colombia, Peru, Brazil (and also formerly Argentina and Paraguay). With about 40 extant languages, it is the largest language family in Latin America.

Etymology 

Arawak is a tribal name in reference to the main crop food, the cassava root, commonly known as manioc. The cassava root is a popular staple for millions of people in South America, Asia and Africa. It is a woody shrub grown in tropical or subtropical regions. Speakers of Arawak also identify themselves as Lokono, which translates as "the people". They call their language Lokono Dian, "the people's speech".

Alternative names of the same language include Arawák, Arahuaco, Aruak, Arowak, Arawac, Araguaco, Aruaqui, Arwuak, Arrowukas, Arahuacos, Locono, and Luccumi.

Geographic distribution 
Lokono is an Arawakan language most commonly found to be spoken in eastern Venezuela, Guyana, Suriname and French Guiana. It was also formerly spoken on Caribbean islands such as Barbados and other neighboring countries. There are approximately 2,500 native speakers today. The following are regions where Arawak has been found spoken by native speakers.

Phonology

Consonants 

William Pet observes an additional /p/ in loanwords.

Vowels

Pet notes that phonetic realization of /o/ varies between [o] and [u].

Grammar
The personal pronouns are shown below. The forms on the left are free forms, which can stand alone. The forms on the right are bound forms (prefixes), which must be attached to the front of a verb, a noun, or a postposition.

Cross-referencing affixes 
All verbs are sectioned into transitive, active transitive, and stative intransitive.

A= Sa=cross referencing prefix

O=So= cross referencing suffix

Vocabulary

Gender 
In the Arawak language, there are two distinct genders of masculine and feminine. They are used in cross-referencing affixes, in demonstratives, in nominalization and in personal pronouns. Typical pronominal genders, for example, are feminine and non-feminine. The markers go back to Arawak third-person singular cross-referencing: feminine -(r)u, masculine -(r)i

Number 
Arawak Languages do distinguish singular and plural, however plural is optional unless the referent is a person. Markers used are *-na/-ni (animate/human plural) and *-pe (inanimate/animate non-human plural).

Possession 
Arawak nouns are fragmented into inalienably and alienably possessed. Inalienably crossed nouns include things such as body parts, terms for kinship and common nouns like food selections. Deverbal nominalization belong to that grouping. Both forms of possession are marked with prefixes (A/Sa). Inalienably possessed nouns have what is known as an "unpossessed" form (also known as "absolute") marked with the suffix *-tfi or *-hV. Alienably possessed nouns take one of the suffixes *-ne/ni, *-te, *-re, *i/e, or *-na. All suffixes used as nominalizers.

Negation 
Arawak languages have a negative prefix ma- and attributive-relative prefix ka-. An example of the use is ka-witi-w ("a woman with good eyes") and ma-witti-w ("a woman with bad eyes", i.e., a blind woman).

Writing system 
The Arawak language system has an alphabetical system similar to the Roman Alphabet with some minor changes and new additions to letters.

 
The letters in brackets under each alphabetical letter is the IPA symbol for each letter.

Examples

References

 

Arawakan languages
Indigenous languages of the South American Northeast
Languages of Guyana
Languages of Suriname
Languages of French Guiana
Languages of Venezuela